Brun-Ly is a businessman who made his fortune in the transport sector. He joined the malagasy political party on the date of the legislative elections of september 23, 2007, the party won 1 seat out of 127.

References

Political parties in Madagascar